Mahyawa or mehyawa is an Iranian cuisine tangy sauce made out of fermented fish.

History
Mahyawa originates in the southern coastal regions of Iran, but has become a popular food item in the Persian Gulf countries, brought by the migration of the Huwala and Ajam communities. It is typically served on top of a wafer thin crispy flat bread called regag or tumushi, and falazi.
Mahyawa is made from salted anchovies and ingredients include: fennel seeds, cumin seeds, coriander seeds and mustard seeds.

Mahyawa is often sold at bakeries and by street vendors in the southern parts of Iran, especially Hormozgan, Bushehr and the southern parts of Fars province, in clear bottles, showing the brown-colored sauce.

See also

 List of fish sauces

Bahraini cuisine
Arab cuisine
Fish sauces
Iranian cuisine
Kuwaiti cuisine
Fermented fish